The Lives of Jenny Dolan is a 1975 made-for-television drama film from producer Ross Hunter. It was Hunter's first work for TV.
 
It was the unsold pilot for a television series.

Plot
A newspaper reporter is jeopardized by her investigation of an assassination.

Cast
Shirley Jones as Jenny Dolan 
Stephen Boyd as Joe Rossiter 
Lynn Carlin as Nancy Royce 
James Darren as Orlando 
Farley Granger as David Ames 
George Grizzard as Ralph Stantlow 
David Hedison as Dr. Wes Dolan 
Stephen McNally as Lt. Nesbitt 
Ian McShane - Saunders 
Pernell Roberts as Camera Shop Proprietor 
Percy Rodrigues as Dr. Mallen 
Collin Wilcox as Mrs. Owens 
Dana Wynter as Andrea Hardesty
Alan Oppenheimer as Springfield

Reception
Synopsis from Modcinema:Looking like a million dollars in a series of fabulous outfits, Shirley Jones plays Jenny Dolan, an ex-investigative reporter. The widow of a wealthy businessman, Jenny suspects her husband met with foul play, and returns to reporting to prove her theory. She uncovers a political assassination plot, but never does solve her husband's murder… because this made-for-TV movie was the pilot for an unsold series, in which Jenny would have spent each week trying to get at the truth. She also would have gone from one exotic foreign locale to another, with an expensive change of wardrobe for each occasion. It should come as no surprise that Lives of Jenny Dolan was the first TV project of famed "glamour film" producer Ross Hunter.

References

External links

The Lives of Jenny Dolan at TCMDB

1975 television films
1975 films
Films about journalism
Films produced by Ross Hunter
NBC network original films
Films directed by Jerry Jameson